This List of governors of Léopoldville / Bandundu includes governors of the Léopoldville Province of the Belgian Congo and its successor Republic of the Congo (Léopoldville), which was divided in 1963–1966 into the provinces of Kwilu, Kwango, and Mai-Ndombe, and governors of the Bandundu Province in the period from when it was formed in 1966 by merging these three provinces and when it was broken up into the former regions in 2015.

Léopoldville Province (1932–1963)

The governors or equivalent of Léopoldville Province were:

Successors (1963–1966)

 Kwilu
 Kwango
 Mai-Ndombe

Bandundu Province (1966–2015)

The governors or equivalent of Bandundu Province were:

See also
Lists of provincial governors of the Democratic Republic of the Congo

References

Governors of provinces of the Democratic Republic of the Congo